The 2013 IS Open was a professional tennis tournament being played on hard courts. It was the first edition and only edition of the tournament which was part of the 2013 ATP Challenger Tour. It is taking place in São Paulo, Brazil between 30 September and 6 October 2013.

Singles main draw entrants

Seeds

 1 Rankings are as of September 23, 2013.

Other entrants
The following players received wildcards into the singles main draw:
  Leonardo Kirche
  Daniel Dutra da Silva
  Thiago Monteiro
  Tiago Lopes

The following players received entry from the qualifying draw:
  Bjorn Fratangelo
  Pedro Sakamoto
  Marcelo Demoliner
  Artem Sitak

Champions

Singles

 Guido Pella def.  Facundo Argüello, 6–1, 6–0

Doubles

 Roman Borvanov /  Artem Sitak def.  Sergio Galdós /  Guido Pella, 6–4, 7–6(7–3)

External links
Official Website

IS Open
IS Open